Héctor José Hernández Marrero (born 14 September 1995) is a Spanish professional footballer who plays as a forward for Portuguese club G.D. Chaves.

Club career
Born in Las Palmas, Canary Islands, Hernández started playing football with hometown club UD Las Palmas and made his senior debut with the reserves in the 2012–13 season, in the Tercera División. On 15 May 2013, he signed with Atlético Madrid for a €250,000 fee plus 750,000 in add-ons, being initially assigned to the B team in the Segunda División B.

Hernández made his debut with the Colchoneros' first team on 18 December 2013, coming on as a 76th-minute substitute for Léo Baptistão and scoring immediately after in a 2–1 Copa del Rey home win against UE Sant Andreu (6–1 on aggregate). He first appeared in La Liga on 25 August of the following year, replacing Mario Mandžukić in a 0–0 draw at Rayo Vallecano.

On 13 August 2015, Hernández joined Elche CF from Segunda División in a season-long loan. One year later, he moved to Albacete Balompié also in a temporary deal; after achieving promotion to the second tier while contributing a career-best 20 goals to the feat, his loan was extended for a further year on 1 September 2017.

On 1 August 2018, Hernández agreed to a one-year loan deal with Málaga CF, still in division two. The following 31 January, after being sparingly used, he moved to fellow league team CF Rayo Majadahonda on loan until June.

On 28 July 2019, Hernández moved to another second division newcomer, CF Fuenlabrada, on loan for one year. The following 1 February, after terminating his contract with Atlético Madrid, he signed until June 2021 with third-tier Cultural y Deportiva Leonesa. In the summer, he joined Rayo Majadahonda in the newly created Primera División RFEF.

Hernández had his first abroad experience in the 2022–23 campaign, with G.D. Chaves who had just returned to the Portuguese Primeira Liga.

Career statistics

References

External links

1995 births
Living people
Spanish footballers
Footballers from Las Palmas
Association football forwards
La Liga players
Segunda División players
Segunda División B players
Tercera División players
Primera Federación players
UD Las Palmas Atlético players
Atlético Madrid B players
Atlético Madrid footballers
Elche CF players
Albacete Balompié players
Málaga CF players
CF Rayo Majadahonda players
CF Fuenlabrada footballers
Cultural Leonesa footballers
Primeira Liga players
G.D. Chaves players
Spain youth international footballers
Spanish expatriate footballers
Expatriate footballers in Portugal
Spanish expatriate sportspeople in Portugal